My War is a record album by the Bear Quartet released in 2000 on the record label A West Side Fabrication. At the time of the release it received generally good reviews. The album has more acoustic guitars than its predecessors, accompanied by electronic sounds.

Track listing
 "What I Hate"
 "Old Friends"
 "Helpless"
 "Everybody Gets to Play"
 "Needs Vs. Facts"
 "Walking Out"
 "Eastbound"
 "I Had a Job"
 "I Don't Wanna"
 "I Can Wait"

References

External links
Short description and lyrics at fan page

2000 albums
The Bear Quartet albums